Piotr Perkowski (17 March 1901 in Oweczacze (Овечаче, Ovechache, now Druzhne), Vinnytsia Oblast, now in Ukraine – 12 August 1990 in Otwock) was a Polish composer.

Perkowski studied at the Music Academy in Warsaw, and in Paris with Albert Roussel. He was a professor and a director at the Conservatory of Toruń (1936–1939). During World War II in occupied Poland he took part in the underground music movement, and fought in the Warsaw Uprising. After 1945, he was a composition teacher in Warsaw and Wroclaw. His pupils included Piotr Moss.

Perkowski composed film music (Żołnierz zwycięstwa, 1953), radio opera (Girlandy, 1961), five ballets, a cantata, two violin concertos and several songs.

Further reading
 Borkowski M. (ed.) - Piotr Perkowski. Life and work, Akademia Muzyczna w Warszawie, Warszawa 2003 [Pol.]
 Mrygoń A. - Perkowski Piotr; in: Encyklopedia Muzyczna PWM (biographical part, ed. Elżbieta Dziębowska), vol. "pe-r", PWM, Kraków 2004 [Pol.]

References
Piotr Perkowski at the Polish Music Information Centre

Piotr Perkowski 

Polish composers
1901 births
1990 deaths
Warsaw Uprising insurgents
Chopin University of Music alumni
20th-century composers
Recipient of the Meritorious Activist of Culture badge